James "Deaf" Burke (8 December 1809 – 8 January 1845), was one of England's earliest boxing champions. He was also deaf.

Career
On 30 May 1833, in a particularly brutal fight for the English heavyweight championship that lasted 3 hours and 6 minutes, Burke defeated Simon Byrne, the Irish champion. Byrne died three days later from his injuries. Burke was promptly arrested and tried for Byrne's murder, but was acquitted on 11 July 1833 and subsequently freed.
The former English champion Jem Ward, who had earlier retired rather than face Burke in the ring, refused to hand over the championship belt or acknowledge Burke as heavyweight champion.

Following Byrne's death and the resulting stigma from having killed his opponent, Burke found it impossible to obtain opponents in Britain. He went to the United States and fought the new Irish champion Sam O'Rourke in New Orleans on 6 May 1837. As the fight progressed, O'Rourke took heavy punishment. In the third round, fearing O'Rourke's defeat, elements of the crowd rioted and caused the fight to be abandoned. Burke was forced to flee on horseback.

On 12 February 1839, Burke fought William Thompson for the English heavyweight crown. Burke was disqualified in the 10th round for hitting Thompson when he was down. Thompson retired the next month and Burke claimed the title.

Jem Ward's younger brother Nick Ward fought Burke for the English championship on 22 September 1840. The fight ended in disarray when Ward's gang forced the referee to disqualify Burke for an alleged foul.

Burke challenged William Perry, 'The Tipton Slasher', to a fight in July 1842. Perry declined.

Burke won his final fight against Bob Castles (to whom he was related by marriage) in the 37th round on 13 June 1843.

Death
At age 35 and in extreme poverty, Burke died of tuberculosis at home on 8 January 1845 in Frances Street, Waterloo, London.  He is buried in St John's Church-yard, Waterloo.

Legacy
He was added to the International Boxing Hall Of Fame in 1992, 147 years after his death.

See also 
Simon Byrne
List of bare-knuckle boxers

References

External links
 Cyber Boxing Zone contains records of James Burke's matches.

1809 births
1845 deaths
Bare-knuckle boxers
19th-century deaths from tuberculosis
Deaf martial artists
English male boxers
Tuberculosis deaths in England
English deaf people